Radio Oranje (Dutch: "Radio Orange") was a Dutch radio programme on the BBC European Service broadcast to the German-occupied Netherlands during World War II. It was transmitted from London and broadcast programmes of approximately 15 minutes. It consisted of brief commentaries on current affairs and political speeches, as well as news on the Free Dutch Forces, colonies, and merchant navy. It was distinct from the BBC's own Dutch Service which only broadcast news programmes and which, unlike Radio Oranje, was not controlled by the Dutch government in exile.

Radio Oranje made its first broadcast on 28 July 1940, consisting of a rendition of the nationalist song Merck toch hoe sterck, followed by a speech by Queen Wilhelmina. In total, Wilhelmina spoke on Radio Oranje 34 times during the course of the war. The name, Radio Oranje, was a tribute to the Dutch monarchy's House of Orange-Nassau.

Presenters
Jan de Hartog
Loe de Jong
Herman de Man
A. den Doolaard
Jetty Paerl

See also

 - (Radio Free Netherlands) Radio Oranje's short-lived predecessor which broadcast from Paris in 1940.
 - The service which eventually replaced Radio Oranje, operating from temporary studios in the liberated southern portion of the country in 1944/45.
Radio Belgique - the Belgian equivalent programme
Radio Londres - the Free French version

Bibliography

 Dra. M. G. Schenk and J. B. Th. Spaan, De Koningin Sprak. Proclamaties en radio-toespraken van H.M. Koningin Wilhelmina 1940-1945, 1945
 H. J. van den Broek, Hier Radio Oranje
 O. Sinke, Verzet vanuit de Verte. De Behoedzame Koers van Radio Oranje, 2009.

Netherlands in World War II
Defunct radio stations in the United Kingdom
BBC World Service foreign language
Dutch resistance
Radio stations established in 1940
1940 establishments in the Netherlands
1940 establishments in England
Radio in the Netherlands
1944 disestablishments in the Netherlands
1944 disestablishments in England
Radio during World War II
Radio stations disestablished in 1944
Defunct mass media in the Netherlands